, formerly  is one of the largest dairy companies in Japan.

In 2000, more than 14,000 people got sick from old milk sold by Snow Brand contaminated with the staphylococcus aureus bacteria, the worst case of food poisoning in Japan. 
A criminal probe into the company led to some senior managers being charged with professional negligence. Two were convicted, and were given suspended sentences. The company was criticized for failing to recall their product quickly.

In January 2003, the company merged with two farm organizations, the National Federation of Agricultural Cooperative Associations and the National Federation of Dairy Cooperative Associations as the Nippon Milk Community Co. and eventually rebranded as the Megmilk Snow Brand Company.

References

External links 
 Megmilk Snow Brand Co., Ltd. (Japanese)
 Megmilk Snow Brand Co., Ltd. (Company information in English)

Food and drink companies of Japan
Dairy products companies of Japan
Food and drink companies established in 1950
Japanese companies established in 1950
2003 mergers and acquisitions
Japanese brands